The following are collected volumes in the Showcase Presents line from DC Comics. All titles begin with the phrase Showcase Presents. Note that when a volume reprints issues which were themselves reprints (e.g., 80-Page Giant specials), only the cover art is included.



Published and forthcoming Showcase Presents volumes

Cancelled Showcase Presents volumes

Notes

Lists of comics by title